Aqiil Gopee (born 22 June 1997) is a Mauritian writer and poet.

His first book, La Pièce, was published in April 2012 by Edilivre Paris, after reception of a jury mention in the Prix du Livre d'Or   2011 competition organised by the Municipality of Quatre-Bornes and presided over by Ananda Devi. Two other books, Fantômes  (prefaced by Ananda Devi) and Orgasmes (a collection of poems) came out in 2013, and in 2014, he was proclaimed laureate of the Prix du jeune écrivain de langue française in France for his short-story 'Loup et Rouge', a re-writing of the tale of the Little Red Riding Hood, and subsequently invited to the Salon du Livre de Paris to attend the 'Écrire à 20 ans' debate. Other awards include The S.I.C.O.M Youth Excellence Award For The Promotion of Literature (2014) and The Prix Jean-Fanchette des Jeunes (2015). His texts are studied at the University of Mauritius.

Published works

 La Pièce, novel, Edilivre, 2012
 Les Hurleuses, short-story, Je Suis Un Vieux Peau-Rouge Qui Ne Marchera Jamais Dans Une File Indienne, L'Atelier d'Écriture, 2012
 Sous Terre, short-story, Collection Maurice, Immedia, 2012
 Fantômes, short-story collection,(preface by Ananda Devi), L'Atelier d'Écriture, 2013  
 Orgasmes, poetry collection, L'Atelier d'Écriture, 2013 
 L'homme et la guitare, short-story Collection Maurice, Immedia, 2013
 Loup et Rouge, short-story Sornettes ou Vérité et autres nouvelles, Buchet-Chastel, 2014 
 Wolves, Dawn, poems, Anthologie de la Poésie Mauricienne Contemporaine d'Expression Française, Acoria, 2014 
 Libellules, short story, Prix Jean-Fanchette des Jeunes,  L'Atelier d'Écriture, 2015 
 Electricity, short-story Collection Maurice, Immedia, 2015

Awards and distinctions 

 Special Mention, Prix du Livre d’Or for 'La Pièce', 2011 
 Special Mention, Prix de Poésie Point Barre, for Wolves, 2013 
 Best Local Writer, National Drama Festival of Mauritius, 2013
 Laureate of the Prix International du Jeune Écrivain de Langue Française for 'Loup et Rouge', 2014
 AEFE Award for 'Loup et Rouge', 2014 
 S.I.C.O.M Youth Excellence Award, Mauritius, 2014
 Prix Jean-Fanchette des Jeunes, 2015 
 Laureate of the Prix International du Jeune Écrivain de Langue Française for 'La Porte en Fer', 2016

References

AQIIL GOPEE, lauréat du Prix du jeune écrivain de langue française : « Je me suis senti opprimé, tellement différent… »
Aqiil Gopee : Writing is a therapy | Defimedia.info
Aqiil Gopee et son aventure française | 5-Plus Dimanche
Aqiil Gopee – The bright bookworm | Defimedia.info
Les « Fantômes » d’Aqiil Gopee ne font pas peur | Le Mauricien
AQIIL GOPEE, lauréat du Prix du jeune écrivain de langue française : « Je me suis senti opprimé, tellement différent… »
Quand deux jeunes écrivains tentent d’inspirer des vocations littéraires

External links

21st-century Mauritian writers
1997 births
Living people
Mauritian poets
Mauritian novelists
Mauritian male writers
21st-century poets
21st-century novelists
21st-century male writers
Mauritian short story writers
21st-century short story writers
Male poets
Male novelists
Male short story writers